is a Japanese football player. He plays for Vanraure Hachinohe.

Playing career
Takamasa Yamazaki played for FC Kariya, Mito HollyHock and Kagoshima United FC from 2014 to 2015. In 2016, he moved to Vanraure Hachinohe.

Club statistics
Updated to 20 February 2017.

References

External links

Profile at Vanraure Hachinohe

1992 births
Living people
Senshu University alumni
Association football people from Gifu Prefecture
Japanese footballers
J2 League players
Japan Football League players
FC Kariya players
Mito HollyHock players
Kagoshima United FC players
Vanraure Hachinohe players
Association football defenders